Verkhniye Mulebki (Dargwa: ЧебяхI Мулебкӏи) is a rural locality (a selo) in Akushinsky District, Republic of Dagestan, Russia. The population was 1,451 as of 2012. There are 8 streets. They speak the Upper Mulebki (kebäX-mulebkila) dialect of Qaba Dargwa (Gabha-dargwa).

Geography 
khniye Mulebki Dargwa village (Akusha district).

Verkhniye Mulebki is located 23 km northeast of Akusha (the district's administrative centre) by road. Nizhneye Mulebki is the nearest rural locality.

References 

Rural localities in Akushinsky District